In Germany, Luxembourg and Austria,  the  Regional-Express (RE, or in Austria: REX) is a type of regional train. It is similar to a semi-fast train, with average speed at about 70–90 km/h (top speed often 160 km/h) as it calls at fewer stations than Regionalbahn or S-Bahn trains, but stops more often than InterCity services.

Operations
The first Regional-Express services were operated by DB Regio, though since the liberalisation of the German rail market (Bahnreform) in the 1990s many operators have received franchise rights on lines from the federal states. Some private operators currently operate trains that are similar to a Regional-Express service, but have decided to use their own names for the sake of brand awareness instead.

Regional-Express services are carried out with a variety of vehicles such as DMUs (of Class 612), EMUs (of Class 425 or 426) or, most commonly, electric or diesel locomotives with double-deck cars, the latter often with new Class 146 engines. Many RE services run in hourly intervals, carrying line numbers and sometimes even names, varying from state to state.

Since late 2006, Regional-Express services between Munich and Nuremberg that operate on the Nuremberg–Munich high-speed railway reach top speeds of 200 km/h. These services are operated with repainted InterCity cars and Class 101 locomotives or Class 102 and double-deck cars.

In Sweden, several regional trains reach 180 or 200 km/h. They are usually called just regional trains, or named after their respective regional transit administration. The most common train types are Øresundståg and Regina.

See also
List of regional rail lines in North Rhine-Westphalia
Train categories in Europe

References 

Passenger rail transport in Germany
Regional rail in Germany